The Abyssinian donkey also called the Ethiopian donkey is a breed of donkey native to Ethiopia. It is used as a beast of burden by the indigenous people and has been described as the "backbone" of rural transportation.

See also 
 List of donkey breeds

References

Donkey breeds